Lung A Pai is a village in Lam Tsuen, Tai Po District, Hong Kong.

Administration
Lung A Pai is a recognized village under the New Territories Small House Policy.

References

External links
 Delineation of area of existing village Lung A Pei (Tai Po) for election of resident representative (2019 to 2022)
 Antiquities Advisory Board. Historic Building Appraisal. Mau Wah Study Hall, Lung A Pai, Tai Po. Pictures

Villages in Tai Po District, Hong Kong
Lam Tsuen